Floctafenine is a nonsteroidal anti-inflammatory drug (NSAID).

Synthesis

The scheme involves first the conversion of ortho-trifluoromethyl aniline (1) to a quinolol. The compound is thus condensed with EMME (Ethoxy Methylene Malonic Diethyl Ester) and cyclized thermally (2). That intermediate is then saponified; the resulting acid is decarboxylated and finally converted to the 4-chloroquinoline (3) by reaction with phosphorus oxychloride. The displacement of chlorine with methyl anthranilate (4) then affords the coupled intermediate (5). An ester interchange of that product with glycerol leads to the glyceryl ester. There is thus obtained the NSAID floctafenine.

See also
 Glafenine, a chemically related NSAID

References

Nonsteroidal anti-inflammatory drugs
Quinolines
Vicinal diols
Trifluoromethyl compounds
Anthranilates